Sandy Rass is a British government statistician and a British songwriter/producer of Fast Food Rockers and others, and a singer, dancer and actor.
He was born in London and trained at the Royal Ballet School for 3 years and then at Italia Conti Academy for a further 3 years as a singer/dancer/actor. As a performer, Rass starred in the West End musicals Starlight Express and Cats, and played leading roles in the UK tours of 42nd Street, What a Feeling! and Living La Vida Loca. He was a backing dancer for numerous pop artists, most notably appearing with Diana Ross at Wembley Stadium, and fronting the pop act Reel 2 Real ("I Like to Move It") on the Smash Hits Tour alongside other major British and international pop acts.

During his varied career he also featured appearances in operas such as The Mikado with the ENO at the Coliseum, La Bohème at the Royal Albert Hall, and The Bartered Bride and Tales of Hoffmann with the Royal Opera Company, before making his name as a pop songwriter.

Writing with Mike Stock of Stock Aitken Waterman, Sandy most notably co-wrote and co-produced "The Fast Food Song" by The Fast Food Rockers - one of the biggest hits of 2003.

He is also known for his work as Musical Supervisor and Musical Arranger on the Singapore Repertory Theatre production of They're Playing Our Song, starring Lea Salonga both in Singapore and Manila in 1999 and 2000, and having radically reworked the musical arrangements of the 1999 London version of Oscar winner Stephen Schwartz's Pippin at the Bridewell Theatre.

Among others, Sandy worked with Nick Bridges from Ministry of Sound, Jon Pearn of Full Intention and Amanda Wilson from Freemasons - the singer of hits "Love on my Mind, "Watchin'", and "Bromance", writing and co-producing the classic Hed Kandi club hit "Intoxicated" performed by R.A.W. featuring Amanda Wilson.

References

1974 births
People educated at the Royal Ballet School
Living people